HD 25171 is a star in the southern constellation of Reticulum, the reticle. With an apparent visual magnitude of 7.79, this star is too faint to be viewed with the naked eye. However, it is readily visible through a small telescope from the southern hemisphere. It has a planetary companion that was announced December 2009.

Based upon its spectrum, this is an ordinary F-type main sequence star with a stellar classification of F8 V. It is slightly larger than the Sun, with 9% more mass and an 7% greater radius. As such, it is radiating 189% of the Sun's luminosity from its outer atmosphere at an effective temperature of 6,063 K. This gives it the yellow-white hued glow of an F-type star. It appears to be roughly the same age as the Sun; around four billion years.

The survey in 2015 have ruled out the existence of any stellar companions at projected distances above 26 astronomical units.

Planetary system
The planetary companion was discovered in 2010 with the HARPS instrument, which measured the radial velocity displacement caused by the gravitational perturbation of the star by the planet. This data provided an orbital period of 1,845 days and set a lower bound of the planet's mass at 95% of the mass of Jupiter. The planetary system of HD 25171 is analogous to Solar System in the sense that a gas giant orbiting outside the frost line, far enough to do not destabilize orbits within a circumstellar habitable zone.

References 

Planetary systems with one confirmed planet
Reticulum (constellation)
025171
F-type main-sequence stars
Durchmusterung objects
009141